Palampiddy is a town in Mannar District, Sri Lanka. Popular Madhu Church is located close to this town.

Towns in Mannar District
Madhu DS Division